Boss Media AB, with its main headquarters in Växjö, Sweden, was a developer of software and systems for digitally distributed gambling entertainment. Boss Media was publicly traded on the Stockholm Stock Exchange from 1999 to 2008, when GEMed bought the company and rebranded it to GTECH Gaming.

History 
Boss Media was founded in 1996, with the initial corporate aim to operate Gold Club Casino, which it launched in 1997. Soon after the online casino was launched, Boss Media launched Casino.com as a casino news portal and the company started receiving requests from investors and companies interested in purchasing Boss Media's casino software as a white label. Boss Media's main focus thereby transferred to the creation of complete white label Internet casino solutions for clients and began to sell licenses at around 300,000 US dollars plus a revenue share.

During the years following, Boss Media was a dominant player in the global online casino software market alongside Microgaming, CryptoLogic and later Playtech amongst others.

During the boom in US online gambling prior to its US ban in 2004, Boss Media was supporting some 32 or more licensees with its software.

Boss Media's corporate focus later shifted to the creation of customised e-gaming systems for several gaming corporations. Boss Media sold its Internet casino in February 2004 to focus entirely on the e-gaming solutions it develops for clients. Boss Media now provides e-gaming solutions for online casino operators including bwin and Sportingbet.

International Poker Network
Boss Media AB, in partnership with St Minver Ltd of Gibraltar, manages the International Poker Network, the platform for over 35 poker rooms.

In May 2007, the International Poker Network partnered with Yahoo! UK in launching Yahoo! Poker.

Dynamite Idea
Boss Media acquired Dynamite Idea of England in April 2008. Dynamite Idea was founded in 1995, at that time specialising in graphic and web design, but became a developer of fixed odds and skill-based betting games, interactive television and fixed odds betting terminal games.

Notes

Online gambling companies of Sweden
Defunct poker companies
Gambling companies established in 1996
Gambling companies disestablished in 2008